The following is the list of Ambassadors to France. Note that some diplomats are accredited by, or to, more than one country.

Current Ambassadors to Paris 

France